The boomslang (or ; Dispholidus typus) is a large, highly venomous snake in the family Colubridae.

Taxonomy and etymology
Its common name means "tree snake" in Dutch  and Afrikaans – boom meaning "tree", and slang meaning "snake". In Afrikaans, the name is pronounced . The boomslang is thought to be closely related to members of the genera Thelotornis, Thrasops, Rhamnophis, and Xyelodontophis, with which it forms the taxonomic tribe Dispholidini.

Subspecies
Two subspecies are recognised, including the nominotypical subspecies.

 D. t. kivuensis 
 D. t. typus 

The trinomial authority in parentheses for D. t. typus indicates that the subspecies was originally described in a genus other than Dispholidus.

Description

Some exceed . The eyes are exceptionally large, and the head has a characteristic egg-like shape. Colouration is highly variable. Males are light green with black or blue scale edges, but adult females may be brown; this demonstrates as sexual dimorphism.

In this species, the head is distinct from the neck and the canthus rostralis is distinct. The pupil of the very large eye is round. The boomslang has excellent eyesight and often moves its head from side to side to get a better view of objects directly in front. The maxillary teeth are small anteriorly, seven or eight in number, followed by three very large, grooved fangs situated below each eye. The mandibular teeth are subequal. The body is slightly compressed. The dorsal scales are very narrow, oblique, strongly keeled, with apical pits, arranged in 19 or 21 rows. The tail is long, and the subcaudal scales are paired. Ventral scales are 164–201; the anal plate is divided; and the subcaudals are 91–131.

Geographic range
The boomslang is endemic to sub-Saharan Africa. It is found in South Africa, Eswatini, Mozambique, Botswana, Namibia and north through sub-Sahara Africa.

Habitat 
The boomslang is an excellent climber and is highly arboreal, living mainly in forested areas. D. typus lives in karoo shrubs, savannahs, lowland forests, and in grasslands. Boomslangs are not restricted to trees and can often be found on the ground to hunt, feed, or take shelter. They will occasionally hide underground when the weather is harsh.

Reproduction
The boomslang is oviparous, and an adult female can produce up to 30 eggs, which are deposited in a hollow tree trunk or rotting log. The eggs have a relatively long (3 months on average) incubation period. Male hatchlings are grey with blue speckles, and female hatchlings are pale brown. They attain their adult colouration after several years.

Behaviour and diet

D. typus is diurnal and almost exclusively arboreal. It is reclusive, and moves from branch to branch when pursued by anything too large to eat. Its diet includes chameleons and other arboreal lizards, frogs, and occasionally small mammals, birds, and eggs from nesting birds and reptiles, all of which it swallows whole. Boomslangs will also feed on other snakes, including cannibalising members of their own species. During cool weather, boomslangs brumate for short periods, often curling up inside the enclosed nest of a weaverbird.

Venom
Many venomous members of the family Colubridae are harmless to humans because of small venom glands and inefficient fangs. However, the boomslang is a notable exception in that it has a highly potent venom, which it delivers through large fangs located in the back of the jaw. The boomslang is able to open its jaws up to 170° when biting. The venom of the boomslang is primarily a hemotoxin; it works by a process in which so many small clots form in the blood that the victim loses the ability to clot further and the victim may die as a result of internal and external bleeding. The venom has been observed to cause haemorrhaging into tissues such as muscle and the brain while at the same time clogging capillaries with tiny blood clots. Other signs and symptoms include headache, nausea, sleepiness, and mental disorders.

Because boomslang venom is slow-acting, symptoms may not become apparent until many hours after the bite. Although the absence of symptoms provides sufficient time for procuring antivenom, it can also provide victims with false reassurance, leading to their underestimating the seriousness of the bite. Snakes of any species may sometimes fail to inject venom when they bite (a so-called "dry bite"), so after a few hours without any noticeable effects, victims of boomslang bites may wrongly believe that their injury is not serious or life-threatening. The pathophysiological mechanisms of the venom are different with every snake, resulting in different clinical manifestations with every patient.

An adult boomslang has 1.6 to 8 mg of venom. Its median lethal dose (LD50) in mice is 0.1 mg/kg (intravenously). 0.071 mg/kg (IV) has also been reported. 12.5 mg/kg  (subcutaneously) and 1.3-1.8 mg/kg (intraperitoneal). Based on the very low venom quantities produced by D. typus, and the very serious effects found in a good part of the reported cases, the lethal dosage for a man would be only 2 to 3 mg.

In 1957, herpetologist Karl Schmidt died after being bitten by a juvenile boomslang, which he had doubted could produce a fatal dose. He made notes on the symptoms he experienced almost to the end. D. S. Chapman reported eight serious envenomations by boomslangs between 1919 and 1962, two of which were lethal.

Boomslang monovalent antivenom was developed during the 1940s. The South African Vaccine Producers manufactures a monovalent antivenom for use in boomslang envenomations.  Treatment of bites may also require complete blood transfusions, especially after 24 to 48 hours without antivenom.

The boomslang is a timid snake, and bites generally occur only when people attempt to handle, catch, or kill the animal. When confronted and cornered, it inflates its neck and assumes an "S"-shaped striking pose.

Gallery

References

Further reading
Access Professional Development. 2022. Boomslang (Dispholidus typus). [Online] Available: https://accesspd.co.za/species/Boomslang  (Accessed: 02/02/2022)
 Branch, Bill  (2004). Field Guide to Snakes and other Reptiles of Southern Africa. Third Revised edition, Second impression. Sanibel Island, Florida: Ralph Curtis Books. . (Dispholidus typus, pp. 99–100 + Plate 31).
 Goin CJ , Goin OB, Zug GR  (1978). Introduction to Herpetology, Third Edition. San Francisco: W. H. Freeman. . (Dispholidus typus, pp. 322, 324.)
 Laurent RF (1955). "Diagnoses preliminaires des quelques Serpents venimeux . Revue de zoologie et de botanique africaines 51: 127–139. (Dispholidus typus kivuensis, new subspecies; D. t. punctatus, new subspecies.)
 Smith A (1828). "Descriptions of New or Imperfectly Known Objects of the Animal Kingdom, Found in the South of Africa". South African Commercial Advertiser 3 (144): 2. (Bucephalus typus, new species.)

External links

 Boomslang (Dispholidus typus)
 Boomslang vs.Chameleon NatGeo
 Boomslang predation on Sabota Lark nest (with video)

Afrikaans words and phrases
Dispholidus
Reptiles described in 1828
Snakes of Africa
Venomous snakes